Charles Weaver may refer to:
Charles A. Weaver (1845–1906), U.S. businessman
Charles P. Weaver (1851–1932), U.S. politician
Charles Weaver (Australian politician) (1817–1874), New South Wales politician
Charlie Weaver (politician) (born 1957), Minnesota politician
Charles Yardley Weaver (1884–1930), Alberta politician
Charlie Weaver (born 1949), American football player
for the actor who played Charley Weaver, see Cliff Arquette
Charles F. Weaver (died 1932), mayor of Ashland, Kentucky